Kroll, LLC, formerly Duff & Phelps LLC, is an American multinational financial consultancy firm based in New York City. It was founded as Duff & Phelps in 1932 by William Duff and George Phelps. Since then, the firm has added more than 30 complementary companies to its portfolio, including the acquisition of Kroll Inc. in 2018. Duff & Phelps decided to start rebranding itself using the Kroll name in 2021, and it completed the renaming process in February 2022.

History

Early days
Duff & Phelps was founded in 1932 by William Duff and George Phelps in Chicago to provide investment research. Since that time, the firm expanded into corporate finance and investment management, as well as credit rating. In 1979, Duff & Phelps expanded into investment management, creating what would become Duff & Phelps Investment Management Co. (DPIMC), which was spun off into its own company in 2009 and was no longer part of the main Duff & Phelps firm.

In 1984, the company was nearly acquired by Security Pacific Corp. in a $35 million transaction.  However, the deal was called off in early 1985 by Security Pacific Corp. because of restraints put on the deal by the Federal Reserve Board, which would have precluded the company from issuing public credit ratings.

Private equity ownership

First leveraged buyout and return to public markets 
The company was acquired five years later, in 1989, in a $146 million management buyout.  The buyout was backed by Freeman, Spogli & Co., a private equity firm that controlled approximately two-thirds of the company, and management and employees owning the remaining third of the company's equity.  The transaction was highly leveraged, financed with 79% bank borrowings and 15% coupon high-yield bonds.  The company was taken public for the first time in 1992 through an initial public offering of stock on the New York Stock Exchange.

By the mid-1990s, Duff & Phelps, which was operating as a publicly traded company, began to focus on its core investment management, financial advisory and corporate finance operations. As a result, in October 1994, the Duff & Phelps's credit rating business, Duff & Phelps Credit Rating Co., was spun off to its shareholders and listed on the New York Stock Exchange.  In 2000, Duff & Phelps Credit Rating Co. was acquired by Fitch Group, which later eliminated the use of the Duff & Phelps name.

Second leveraged buyout and return to public markets  
In 2004, Lovell Minnick Partners sponsored a management buyout of the company, the second time the company had undergone a leveraged buyout transaction, acquiring the company from its then owner, Webster Financial Corporation. As part of the transaction, the company was merged with Stone Ridge Partners, a middle-market investment banking firm. In 2005, the company raised equity from Vestar Capital Partners to support the company's acquisition strategy that included the purchase of Standard & Poor's Corporate Value Consulting business as well as Valuemetrics, a financial advisory firm specializing in valuation services founded in 1981. In 2006, it acquired specialty restructuring firm Chanin Capital Partners, LLC.

In 2007, Duff & Phelps completed its second initial public offering raising $133 million and listing the company's shares on the New York Stock Exchange. The IPO provided a partial exit for its two private equity financial sponsors. Also in 2007, the firm formed a strategic alliance with Tokyo-based Shinsei Bank. The firm has continued its acquisition strategy acquiring Dubinsky & Co., a financial consulting company and Kane Reece Associates.  In 2010, the firm acquired the consulting business of Dynamic Credit Partners, bringing specialized talent in complex fixed income securities analysis, valuation and litigation support.

Subsequent LBO buyouts and private company history 
After less than five years as a public company, Duff & Phelps again agreed to a take-private offer from private equity firms. On December 30, 2012, Duff & Phelps, announced that it had entered into an agreement to be acquired for approximately $665.5 million by a consortium, comprising controlled affiliates of or funds managed by The Carlyle Group, Stone Point Capital LLC, Pictet & Cie and Edmond de Rothschild Group.

In December 2015, Duff & Phelps announced that the University of California’s Office of the Chief Investment Officer would make a significant minority investment in the firm. As part of the transaction, The Carlyle Group and Duff & Phelps’ senior management group increased its investment. Stonepoint Capital LLC, Edmond de Rothschild Group and Pictet Group sold their equity interest in Duff & Phelps.

In November of 2017, Permira, a global private equity firm, announced the acquisition of Duff & Phelps from The Carlyle Group, Neuberger Berman, the University of California’s Office of the Chief Investment Officer of the Regents and Pictet & Cie for $1.75 billion. The management team, led by CEO, Noah Gottdiener and President, Jacob Silverman, maintained a significant equity stake in the company and remained in their rolls.

In January of 2020, Duff & Phelps announced it had agreed to be acquired by a global investor consortium led by funds managed by Stone Point Capital and Further Global at a valuation of $4.2 billion. Permira as well as the existing management team agreed to maintain a "a meaningful equity stake in the firm."

M&A history 
In 2007, Duff & Phelps acquired Rash & Associates, a nationwide provider of property tax management services. In 2009, Duff & Phelps acquired Lumin Expert Group, a financial consulting firm specializing in intellectual property dispute support and expert testimony. In June 2010, Duff & Phelps announced it acquired Cole & Partners, a Toronto-based independent financial advisory practice. The acquisition established a Canadian presence for Duff & Phelps and enhanced the firm’s dispute consulting, valuation and corporate finance advisory services. In July 2011, Duff & Phelps announced it acquired Growth Capital Partners, a Texas-based investment banking firm focused on transactions in the middle market. 

In July 2014, Duff & Phelps acquired the Restructuring and Insolvency Division of RSM Farrell Grant Sparks (“RSM FGS”), one of the largest dedicated restructuring and insolvency teams operating in the Republic of Ireland. The acquisition expanded Duff & Phelps’ Global Restructuring Advisory Practice to include more than 200 professionals across Europe, the U.S. and Canada. In 2015, Duff & Phelps made two significant acquisitions. The first was of Kinetic Partners, a UK-based financial regulatory consulting firm with 200 employees. As a result of this acquisition, Duff & Phelps launched its Financial Regulatory and Compliance practice. The second acquisition was of American Appraisal, a Milwaukee-based valuation company with nearly 1,000 employees globally. This acquisition broadened the type of valuation work Duff & Phelps did in the U.S., specifically in fixed asset management and insurance solutions (FAMIS). In addition to the new locations in the U.S., the acquisition established new locations for the firm in Europe and Asia. The American Appraisal acquisition also included the Real Estate Advisory Group (REAG) business.

In May 2016, Duff & Phelps acquired Corporate Finance Ireland (CFI), a leading corporate finance firm in the Republic of Ireland.

Duff & Phelps bought Kroll Inc., a corporate investigation and risk consulting firm, in 2018 and it purchased Prime Clerk in 2019.

After completing the acquisition of Kroll Inc. in 2018, Duff & Phelps announced it would change its company name to Kroll in 2021. Certain Duff & Phelps businesses would operate as "Duff & Phelps, A Kroll Business" for a period of time during the transition.

Controversies
In August 2020, in the Court of Session, the Scottish Lord Advocate accepted that the prosecution of two Duff & Phelps administrators, Paul Clark and David Whitehouse, after the Rangers F.C. administration in 2012 had been "malicious" and without "probable cause". The court ordered the interim payment of £600,000 costs to the administrators. The administrators sought £20.8 million in damages from the Crown Office and Police Scotland.

References

Companies listed on the New York Stock Exchange
Investment banks in the United States
Financial services companies established in 1932
Consulting firms established in 1932
Credit rating agencies
Private equity portfolio companies